C. superbus may refer to:
 Calochortus superbus, the superb mariposa lily, a flowering plant species
 Cyornis superbus, the Bornean blue-flycatcher, a bird species found in Brunei and Indonesia

See also
 Superbus (disambiguation)